Stottville is a hamlet and census-designated place (CDP) in Columbia County, New York, United States. The population was 1,375 at the 2010 census.

Stottville is in the southern part of the town of Stockport, south of Stockport Creek, and in the northern section  of the town of Greenport.

Geography
Stottville hamlet is located along Claverack Creek, a tributary of Stockport Creek, at  (42.285238, -73.747933). The Stottville CDP includes most of the southern part of the town of Stockport, as well as the northernmost part of the town of Greenport. It is bordered to the north by Stockport hamlet and to the south by Lorenz Park in Greenport. The Hudson River is to the west.

U.S. Route 9 runs through Stottville, leading south  to Hudson, the Columbia County seat, and north  to Kinderhook.

Demographics

As of the census of 2000, there were 1,355 people, 544 households, and 354 families residing in the CDP. The population density was 329.0 per square mile (127.0/km2). There were 582 housing units at an average density of 141.3/sq mi (54.5/km2). The racial makeup of the CDP was 94.98% White, 1.70% African American, 0.44% Native American, 0.52% Asian, 0.59% from other races, and 1.77% from two or more races. Hispanic or Latino of any race were 2.14% of the population.

There were 544 households, out of which 30.3% had children under the age of 18 living with them, 47.4% were married couples living together, 11.9% had a female householder with no husband present, and 34.9% were non-families. 29.2% of all households were made up of individuals, and 14.9% had someone living alone who was 65 years of age or older. The average household size was 2.47 and the average family size was 2.98.

In the CDP, the population was spread out, with 25.2% under the age of 18, 7.0% from 18 to 24, 28.6% from 25 to 44, 23.2% from 45 to 64, and 16.0% who were 65 years of age or older. The median age was 39 years. For every 100 females, there were 90.6 males. For every 100 females age 18 and over, there were 89.3 males.

The median income for a household in the CDP was $36,696, and the median income for a family was $44,688. Males had a median income of $31,250 versus $24,044 for females. The per capita income for the CDP was $17,419. About 15.5% of families and 19.7% of the population were below the poverty line, including 34.9% of those under age 18 and 10.1% of those age 65 or over.

References

External links
Stottville Fire Company

Census-designated places in New York (state)
Hamlets in New York (state)
Census-designated places in Columbia County, New York
Hamlets in Columbia County, New York